In the 1945 Virginia gubernatorial election, incumbent Governor Colgate Darden, a Democrat, was unable to seek re-election due to term limits. Lieutenant Governor William M. Tuck was nominated by the Democratic Party to run against Republican state senator S. Floyd Landreth.

Candidates
William M. Tuck, Lieutenant Governor of Virginia (D)
S. Floyd Landreth, (R), state senator

Results

References

Gubernatorial
1945
Virginia
November 1945 events in the United States